Minuscule 807 (in the Gregory-Aland numbering), A311 (von Soden), is a Greek minuscule manuscript of the New Testament written on parchment, with a commentary. Palaeographically it has been assigned to the 12th century. The manuscript is lacunose.

Description 
The codex contains the text of the three first Gospels, on 281 parchment leaves (size ), with some lacunae (Matthew 1:1-15:29; Mark 1:1-14; Jo 21:8-25). According to Gregory the whole manuscript has 371 leaves (31.2 by 22.9 cm), but first 83 leaves do not contain biblical matter.

The text is written in one column per page, 38-39 lines per page.
The biblical text is surrounded by a catena.

There is also another division according to the Ammonian Sections (in Mark 240 Sections, the last section in 16,19), with references to the Eusebian Canons.

Text 
Aland the Greek text of the codex did not place in any Category.

It was not examined by using the Claremont Profile Method.

It contains text of the Pericope Adulterae (John 7:53-8:11), but without a commentary.

History 
According to C. R. Gregory the manuscript was written in the 14th century. The manuscript is currently dated by the INTF to the 12th century.

It was added to the list of New Testament manuscripts by Gregory (807e). Gregory saw the manuscript in 1886. Gregory classified this manuscript also as minuscule 1368 (13th century, 277 leaves (30 by 23 cm), 38 lines per page, biblical text in red, commentary in black, lacunae in Matthew, Mark, John). Gregory used description of one Spartaner Strategopoulos.
Aland noticed that it is the same manuscript, and 1368 was deleted from the list (empty number on his list).

The manuscript is now housed at the library of the Hellenic Parliament (1) in Athens.

See also 

 List of New Testament minuscules
 Biblical manuscript
 Textual criticism
 Minuscule 806

References

Further reading 

 

Greek New Testament minuscules
12th-century biblical manuscripts